Spoilers of the North is a 1947 American film directed by Richard Sale and starring Paul Kelly, Lorna Gray (billed as "Adrian Booth"), and Evelyn Ankers.

Plot summary

Cast 
Paul Kelly as Matt Garraway
Lorna Gray as Jane Koster (Billed as "Adrian Booth")
Evelyn Ankers as Laura Reed
James Millican as Bill Garraway
Roy Barcroft as Moose McGovern
Louis Jean Heydt as Inspector Carl Winters
Ted Hecht as Joe Taku
Harlan Briggs as Salty
Francis McDonald as Pete Koster
Maurice Cass as Doctor
Neyle Morrow as Johnny

Soundtrack

External links 

1947 films
1947 drama films
American black-and-white films
Republic Pictures films
American drama films
1940s English-language films
1940s American films